= Meiros =

Town in ancient Phrygia

Coordinates: 39°12′19″N 30°22′34″E

Meiros was a town of ancient Phrygia, inhabited during Roman and Byzantine times.

Its site is located near Demirözü in Asiatic Turkey.
